David Navas Chica (born 10 June 1974 in Ávila) is a Spanish professional road bicycle racer.

Palmarès 

 Volta ao Minho - 1 stage (2000)

External links 
 

Spanish male cyclists
1974 births
Living people
People from Ávila, Spain
Sportspeople from the Province of Ávila
Cyclists from Castile and León